Talia Jane (born Talia Ben-Ora in 1990 or 1991) is an American writer and labor activist. They are known for bringing attention to minimum wage compensation across tech companies in the San Francisco Bay Area.

Education and career 
Jane attended community college until they transferred to California State University, Long Beach, where they earned a Bachelor of Arts in English literature.

Jane is a freelance journalist and has contributed to Mic, Vice, Allure, Elle, and The Guardian. They also worked as a writer for Full Frontal with Samantha Bees trivia game This Is Not A Game: The Game. As an independent reporter, in 2020, Jane attended protests in Manhattan following the death of football player Johnathan Price and later election protests in Washington, D.C.

Activism at Yelp
In February 2016, Jane published an open letter on Medium to Jeremy Stoppelman, the chief executive officer of Yelp, where they worked as a customer service representative for Yelp's Eat24 food delivery service. The letter contrasted the minimum-wage hourly pay of their role and the high cost of living in the Bay Area, highlighting the workers' $12.25 hourly wages, the cost of housing and groceries, and poverty issues among their colleagues. Jane said the only housing they could afford with their pay was 30 miles east in Concord, and had no money left for food after rent and transportation to work.

They were fired shortly after they published the letter, the news of which garnered significant media attention. Jane was both credited for sparking an important conversation about living wages, and criticized for their method of delivery. In an analysis for the Washington Post, writer Malcolm Harris noted that Jane was "pilloried in the media as just another entitled millennial who wanted things handed to them" but noted of the resulting wage increase: "Many large labor actions have achieved less".

They said that they were told they were being terminated due to the Medium post, would receive severance of $1,000, and would not be allowed to return to work at Yelp. Stoppelman denied that Jane's termination was related to the letter, and a spokesperson for Yelp stated, "We do not comment on personnel issues." However, two weeks later, after former employee Jaymee Senigaglia wrote her own open letter, Yelp published justification for her termination on Twitter.

In April 2016, Yelp raised the pay of Eat24 customer service representatives from $12.25 to $14 an hour, added 11 paid holidays (up from zero), and increased the number of days of paid time off from 5 to 15. Yelp did not reference Jane in its announcement and said that changes had been in the works since quarter 4 2015 – three months before Jane published their letter. Employees at Yelp reportedly disputed this claim and believed Jane was the "whistleblower" who prompted the changes.

Awards and recognition
Jane was named one of Business Insiders 100 "most amazing and inspiring people in tech right now" as well as one of Inc's "25 Coolest Women in Silicon Valley," both of which credited their open letter for the subsequent conversations about living wages in Silicon Valley.

In 2016, Jane spoke at XOXO Festival on the impact of online harassment.

Personal life 
Jane grew up in Concord, California with their mother, a practicing Wiccan, and near their father. At 10 years old, Jane unknowingly became an accomplice to spree killers Glenn Helzer, Justin Helzer, and Dawn Godman, after Jane's mother purchased movie tickets as an alibi for the trio. Their mother testified against the killers, and was later committed to the psychiatric ward, and Jane went to live with their grandparents in Southern California. They later wrote about the experience.

In May 2019, Jane was the recipient of a sexually explicit message via Twitter that was sent to them by a Seattle Times reporter. The reporter was suspended by the Times and resigned from the paper on June 7, 2019.

References

External links
 Official Website

1990s births
21st-century American writers
Activists from California
American bloggers
American writers
American social activists
Workers' rights activists
American whistleblowers
Living people
People from Concord, California
Writers from California
Year of birth missing (living people)